Among My Favorites is a studio album by Filipino singer-actress Nora Aunor, released in 1970 by Alpha Records Corporation in the Philippines in LP format and later released in 1999 in a compilation/ cd format.  The album contains original Filipino compositions by Robert Medina, George Canseco and Danny Subido, among others. Some of the recordings are covers of popular songs such as "Mama" and "I Believe".

Background
Among My Favorites was arranged and conducted by Danny Subido and Doming Valdez with the accompaniment by The Ramrods and recorded at CAI Studios.  The album contains 12 songs and some of them are original compositions.

Track listing

Side one

Side two

Album credits 
Arranged and conducted by

 Doming Valdez
 For Million Years
 Mistaken
 Loving You

Arranged and supervised by
 Danny Subido
 (the rest of the album

Accompaniment by
 The Ramrods

Recorded at
 CAI Studios

References 

Nora Aunor albums
1970 albums